The Man Who Dared is a 1939 American crime film directed by Crane Wilbur and written by Lee Katz. The film stars Jane Bryan, Charley Grapewin, Henry O'Neill, Johnny Russell, Elisabeth Risdon and James McCallion. The film was released by Warner Bros. on June 3, 1939.

Plot
In the late 1930s, whistleblower, Stuart McCrary, and his wife, Mary, are killed by Nick Bartel and other henchmen of the town's corrupt mayor to prevent McCrary's upcoming grand jury testimony.  The Carter family, living next door to the McCrarys, witness the murders.  After the mayor uses intimidation, threats, assault and, finally, the kidnapping of the Carters' young son, Bill, to keep them from testifying against Bartel, only the boy's grandfather, Ulysses Porterfield, has the courage to testify. The family is placed under police protection before their grand jury appearance.  However, Porterfield escapes, rescues Bill, and appears in court as the only cooperating witness, which presumably leads to criminal indictments against Bartel, the mayor and his corrupt organization.

Cast          
Jane Bryan as Marge Carter
Charley Grapewin as Ulysses Porterfield
Henry O'Neill as Matthew Carter
Johnny Russell as Ted Carter 
Elisabeth Risdon as Jessie Carter 
James McCallion as Ralph Carter
Dickie Jones as Bill Carter
Frederic Tozere as Stephen Palmer
John Gallaudet as Nick Bartel
Grace Stafford as Mary McCrary

References

External links 
 

1939 films
Warner Bros. films
American crime films
1939 crime films
Films directed by Crane Wilbur
American black-and-white films
1930s English-language films
1930s American films